British Columbia, commonly abbreviated as BC, is the westernmost province of Canada, situated between the Pacific Ocean and the Rocky Mountains. It has a diverse geography, with rugged landscapes that include rocky coastlines, sandy beaches, forests, lakes, mountains, inland deserts and grassy plains, and borders the province of Alberta to the east, the territories of Yukon and Northwest Territories to the north, and the US states of Washington, Idaho and Montana to the south and Alaska to the northwest. With an estimated population of 5.3million as of 2022, it is Canada's third-most populous province. The capital of British Columbia is Victoria and its largest city is Vancouver. Vancouver is the third-largest metropolitan area in Canada; the 2021 census recorded 2.6million people in Metro Vancouver.

The first known human inhabitants of the area settled in British Columbia at least 10,000 years ago. Such groups include the Coast Salish, Tsilhqotʼin, and Haida peoples, among many others. One of the earliest British settlements in the area was Fort Victoria, established in 1843, which gave rise to the city of Victoria, the capital of the Colony of Vancouver Island. The Colony of British Columbia (1858–1866) was subsequently founded by Richard Clement Moody, and by the Royal Engineers, Columbia Detachment, in response to the Fraser Canyon Gold Rush. Moody selected the site for and founded the mainland colony's capital New Westminster. The colonies of Vancouver Island and British Columbia were incorporated in 1866, subsequent to which Victoria became the united colony's capital. In 1871, British Columbia entered Confederation as the sixth province of Canada, in enactment of the British Columbia Terms of Union.

British Columbia is a diverse and cosmopolitan province, drawing on a plethora of cultural influences from its British Canadian, European, and Asian diasporas, as well as the Indigenous population. Though the province's ethnic majority originates from the British Isles, many British Columbians also trace their ancestors to continental Europe, East Asia, and South Asia. Indigenous Canadians constitute about 6 percent of the province's total population. Christianity is the largest religion in the region, though the majority of the population is non-religious. English is the common language of the province, although Punjabi, Mandarin Chinese, and Cantonese also have a large presence in the Metro Vancouver region. The Franco-Columbian community is an officially recognized linguistic minority, and around one percent of British Columbians claim French as their mother tongue. British Columbia is home to at least 34 distinct Indigenous languages.

Major sectors of British Columbia's economy include forestry, mining, filmmaking and video production, tourism, real estate, construction, wholesale, and retail. Its main exports include lumber and timber, pulp and paper products, copper, coal, and natural gas. British Columbia exhibits high property values and is a significant centre for maritime trade: the Port of Vancouver is the largest port in Canada and the most diversified port in North America. Although less than 5 percent of the province's territory is arable land, significant agriculture exists in the Fraser Valley and Okanagan due to the warmer climate. British Columbia is home to 45% of all publicly listed companies in Canada.

Etymology
The province's name was chosen by Queen Victoria, when the Colony of British Columbia (1858–1866), i.e., "the Mainland", became a British colony in 1858. It refers to the Columbia District, the British name for the territory drained by the Columbia River, in southeastern British Columbia, which was the namesake of the pre-Oregon Treaty Columbia Department of the Hudson's Bay Company. Queen Victoria chose British Columbia to distinguish what was the British sector of the Columbia District from the United States' ("American Columbia" or "Southern Columbia"), which became the Oregon Territory on August 8, 1848, as a result of the treaty.

Ultimately, the Columbia in the name British Columbia is derived from the name of the Columbia Rediviva, an American ship which lent its name to the Columbia River and later the wider region; the Columbia in the name Columbia Rediviva came from the name Columbia for the New World or parts thereof, a reference to Christopher Columbus.

The governments of Canada and British Columbia recognize  as the French name for the province. However, as of 2016, the French language is spoken by a small minority of BC residents (1.4 percent).

Geography

British Columbia is bordered to the west by the Pacific Ocean and the American state of Alaska, to the north by Yukon and the Northwest Territories, to the east by the province of Alberta, and to the south by the American states of Washington, Idaho, and Montana. The southern border of British Columbia was established by the 1846 Oregon Treaty, although its history is tied with lands as far south as California. It is the only province in Canada that borders the Pacific Ocean.

British Columbia's capital is Victoria, located at the southeastern tip of Vancouver Island. Only a narrow strip of Vancouver Island, from Campbell River to Victoria, is significantly populated. Much of the western part of Vancouver Island and the rest of the coast is covered by temperate rainforest.

The province's most populous city is Vancouver, which is at the confluence of the Fraser River and Georgia Strait, in the mainland's southwest corner (an area often called the Lower Mainland). By land area, Abbotsford is the largest city. Vanderhoof is near the geographic centre of the province.

The province's mainland away from the coastal regions is somewhat moderated by the Pacific Ocean. Terrain ranges from dry inland forests and semi-arid valleys, to the range and canyon districts of the Central and Southern Interior, to boreal forest and subarctic prairie in the Northern Interior. High mountain regions both north and south have subalpine flora and subalpine climate.

The Okanagan wine area, extending from Vernon to Osoyoos at the United States border, is one of several wine and cider-producing regions in Canada. Other wine regions in British Columbia include the Cowichan Valley on Vancouver Island and the Fraser Valley.

The Southern Interior cities of Kamloops and Penticton have some of the warmest and longest summer climates in Canada (while higher elevations are cold and snowy), although their temperatures are often exceeded north of the Fraser Canyon, close to the confluence of the Fraser and Thompson rivers, where the terrain is rugged and covered with desert-type flora. Semi-desert grassland is found in large areas of the Interior Plateau, with land uses ranging from ranching at lower altitudes to forestry at higher ones.

The northern, mostly mountainous, two-thirds of the province is largely unpopulated and undeveloped, except for the area east of the Rockies, where the Peace River Country contains BC's portion of the Canadian Prairies, centred at the city of Dawson Creek.

British Columbia is considered part of the Pacific Northwest and the Cascadia bioregion, along with the American states of Alaska, Idaho, (western) Montana, Oregon, Washington, and (northern) California.

Climate

Because of the many mountain ranges and rugged coastline, British Columbia's climate varies dramatically across the province.

Coastal southern British Columbia has a mild, rainy oceanic climate, influenced by the North Pacific Current, which has its origins in the Kuroshio Current.

The valleys of the Southern Interior have short winters with only brief bouts of cold or infrequent heavy snow, while those in the Cariboo, in the Central Interior, are colder because of increased altitude and latitude, but without the intensity or duration experienced at similar latitudes elsewhere in Canada. Outside of the driest valleys, the Southern and Central Interior generally have a humid continental climate with widely variable precipitation. Small towns in the southern interior with high elevation such as Princeton are typically colder and snowier than cities in the valleys.

Heavy snowfall occurs in all elevated mountainous terrain providing bases for skiers in both south and central British Columbia. Annual snowfall on highway mountain passes in the southern interior rivals some of the snowiest cities in Canada, and freezing rain and fog are sometimes present on such roads as well. This can result in hazardous driving conditions, as people are usually travelling between warmer areas such as Vancouver or Kamloops, and may be unaware that the conditions may be slippery and cold.

Winters are generally severe in the Northern Interior which is generally in the subarctic climate zone, but even there, milder air can penetrate far inland. Atlin in the province's far northwest, along with the adjoining Southern Lakes region of Yukon, get midwinter thaws caused by the Chinook effect, which is also common (and much warmer) in more southerly parts of the Interior.

During winter on the coast, rainfall, sometimes relentless heavy rain, dominates because of consistent barrages of cyclonic low-pressure systems from the North Pacific. Arctic outflow winds can occasionally result in wind chill temperatures at or even below .. While winters are very wet, coastal areas are generally milder and dry during summer under the influence of stable anti-cyclonic high pressure.

Southern Interior valleys are hot in summer; for example, in Osoyoos, the July maximum temperature averages , making it the hottest month of any location in Canada; this hot weather sometimes spreads towards the coast or to the far north of the province. Temperatures often exceed  in the lower elevations of valleys in the Interior during mid-summer, with the record high of  being held in Lytton on June 29, 2021, during a record-breaking heat wave that year.

The extended summer dryness often creates conditions that spark forest fires, from dry-lightning or man-made causes. Many areas of the province are often covered by a blanket of heavy cloud and low fog during the winter months, in contrast to abundant summer sunshine. Annual sunshine hours vary from 2200 near Cranbrook and Victoria to less than 1300 in Prince Rupert, on the North Coast just south of Southeast Alaska.

The exception to British Columbia's wet and cloudy winters is during the El Niño phase. During El Niño events, the jet stream is much farther south across North America, making the province's winters milder and drier than normal. Winters are much wetter and cooler during the opposite phase, La Niña.

Parks and protected areas

There are 14 designations of parks and protected areas in the province that reflect the different administration and creation of these areas in a modern context. There are 141 ecological reserves, 35 provincial marine parks, 7 provincial heritage sites, 6 National Historic Sites of Canada, 4 national parks and 3 national park reserves. 12.5 percent of the province's area is considered protected under one of the 14 different designations that includes over 800 distinct areas.

British Columbia contains seven of Canada's national parks and National Park Reserves:

 Glacier National Park
 Gulf Islands National Park Reserve
 Gwaii Haanas National Park Reserve and Haida Heritage Site
 Kootenay National Park
 Mount Revelstoke National Park
 Pacific Rim National Park Reserve
 Yoho National Park

British Columbia contains a large number of provincial parks, run by BC Parks under the aegis of the Ministry of Environment. British Columbia's provincial parks system is the second largest parks system in Canada, the largest being Canada's National Parks system.

Another tier of parks in British Columbia are regional parks, which are maintained and run by the province's regional districts. The Ministry of Forests operates forest recreation sites.

Fauna

Much of the province is undeveloped, so populations of many mammalian species that have become rare in much of the United States still flourish in British Columbia. Watching animals of various sorts, including a very wide range of birds, has long been popular. Bears (grizzly, black—including the Kermode bear or spirit bear) live here, as do deer, elk, moose, caribou, big-horn sheep, mountain goats, marmots, beavers, muskrats, coyotes, wolves, mustelids (such as wolverines, badgers and fishers), cougars, eagles, ospreys, herons, Canada geese, swans, loons, hawks, owls, ravens, harlequin ducks, and many other sorts of ducks. Smaller birds (robins, jays, grosbeaks, chickadees, and so on) also abound. Murrelets are known from Frederick Island, a small island off the coast of Haida Gwaii.

Many healthy populations of fish are present, including salmonids such as several species of salmon, trout, and char. Besides salmon and trout, sport-fishers in BC also catch halibut, steelhead, bass, and sturgeon. On the coast, harbour seals and river otters are common. Cetacean species native to the coast include the orca, humpback whale, grey whale, harbour porpoise, Dall's porpoise, Pacific white-sided dolphin and minke whale.

Some endangered species in British Columbia are: Vancouver Island marmot, spotted owl, American white pelican, and badgers.

Forests
White spruce or Engelmann spruce and their hybrids occur in 12 of the 14 biogeoclimatic zones of British Columbia. Common types of trees present in BC's forests include western redcedar, yellow-cedar, Rocky Mountain juniper, lodgepole pine, ponderosa or yellow pine, whitebark pine, limber pine, western white pine, western larch, tamarack, alpine larch, white spruce, Engelmann spruce, Sitka spruce, black spruce, grand fir, Amabilis fir, subalpine fir, western hemlock, mountain hemlock, Douglas-fir, western yew, Pacific dogwood, bigleaf maple, Douglas maple, vine maple, arbutus, black hawthorn, cascara, Garry oak, Pacific crab apple, choke cherry, pin cherry, bitter cherry, red alder, mountain alder, paper birch, water birch, black cottonwood, balsam poplar, trembling aspen.

Traditional plant foods

First Nations peoples of British Columbia used plants for food, and to produce material goods like fuel and building products. Plant foods included berries, and roots like camas.

Ecozones
Environment Canada subdivides British Columbia into six ecozones:

 Pacific Marine
 Pacific Maritime
 Boreal Cordillera
 Montane Cordillera
 Taiga Plains
 Boreal Plains Ecozones.

History

Indigenous societies

The area now known as British Columbia is home to First Nations groups that have a deep history with a significant number of indigenous languages. There are more than 200 First Nations in BC. Prior to contact (with non-Aboriginal people), human history is known from oral histories of First Nations groups, archaeological investigations, and from early records from explorers encountering societies early in the period.

The arrival of Paleoindians from Beringia took place between 20,000 and 12,000 years ago. Hunter-gatherer families were the main social structure from 10,000 to 5,000 years ago. The nomadic population lived in non-permanent structures foraging for nuts, berries and edible roots while hunting and trapping larger and small game for food and furs. Around 5,000 years ago individual groups started to focus on resources available to them locally. Coast Salish peoples had complex land management practices linked to ecosystem health and resilience. Forest gardens on Canada's northwest coast included crabapple, hazelnut, cranberry, wild plum, and wild cherry species. Thus with the passage of time there is a pattern of increasing regional generalization with a more sedentary lifestyle. These indigenous populations evolved over the next 5,000 years across a large area into many groups with shared traditions and customs.

To the northwest of the province are the peoples of the Na-Dene languages, which include the Athapaskan-speaking peoples and the Tlingit, who lived on the islands of southern Alaska and northern British Columbia. The Na-Dene language group is believed to be linked to the Yeniseian languages of Siberia. The Dene of the western Arctic may represent a distinct wave of migration from Asia to North America. The Interior of British Columbia was home to the Salishan language groups such as the Shuswap (Secwepemc), Okanagan and Athabaskan language groups, primarily the Dakelh (Carrier) and the Tsilhqot'in. The inlets and valleys of the British Columbia coast sheltered large, distinctive populations, such as the Haida, Kwakwaka'wakw and Nuu-chah-nulth, sustained by the region's abundant salmon and shellfish. These peoples developed complex cultures dependent on the western red cedar that included wooden houses, seagoing whaling and war canoes and elaborately carved potlatch items and totem poles.

Contact with Europeans brought a series of devastating epidemics of diseases from Europe the people had no immunity to. The result was a dramatic population collapse, culminating in the 1862 Smallpox outbreak in Victoria that spread throughout the coast. European settlement did not bode well for the remaining native population of British Columbia. Colonial officials deemed colonists could make better use of the land than the First Nations people, and thus the land territory be owned by the colonists. To ensure colonists would be able to settle properly and make use of the land, First Nations were forcibly relocated onto reserves, which were often too small to support their way of life. By the 1930s, British Columbia had over 1500 reserves.

Fur trade and colonial era

Lands now known as British Columbia were added to the British Empire during the 19th century. Colonies originally begun with the support of the Hudson's Bay Company (Vancouver Island, the mainland) were amalgamated, then entered Confederation as British Columbia in 1871 as part of the Dominion of Canada.

During the 1770s, smallpox killed at least 30 percent of the Pacific Northwest First Nations. This devastating epidemic was the first in a series; the 1862 Pacific Northwest smallpox epidemic killed about half to two-thirds of the native population of what became British Columbia.

The arrival of Europeans began around the mid-18th century, as fur traders entered the area to harvest sea otters. While it is thought Sir Francis Drake may have explored the British Columbian coast in 1579, it was Juan Pérez who completed the first documented voyage, which took place in 1774. Juan Francisco de la Bodega y Quadra explored the coast in 1775. In doing so, Pérez and Quadra reasserted the Spanish claim for the Pacific coast, first made by Vasco Núñez de Balboa in 1513.

The explorations of James Cook in 1778 and George Vancouver in 1792 and 1793 established British jurisdiction over the coastal area north and west of the Columbia River. In 1793, Sir Alexander Mackenzie was the first European to journey across North America overland to the Pacific Ocean, inscribing a stone marking his accomplishment on the shoreline of Dean Channel near Bella Coola. His expedition theoretically established British sovereignty inland, and a succession of other fur company explorers charted the maze of rivers and mountain ranges between the Canadian Prairies and the Pacific. Mackenzie and other explorers—notably John Finlay, Simon Fraser, Samuel Black, and David Thompson—were primarily concerned with extending the fur trade, rather than political considerations. In 1794, by the third of a series of agreements known as the Nootka Conventions, Spain conceded its claims of exclusivity in the Pacific. This opened the way for formal claims and colonization by other powers, including Britain, but because of the Napoleonic Wars, there was little British action on its claims in the region until later.

The establishment of trading posts by the North West Company and the Hudson's Bay Company (HBC), effectively established a permanent British presence in the region. The Columbia District was broadly defined as being south of 54°40 north latitude, (the southern limit of Russian America), north of Mexican-controlled California, and west of the Rocky Mountains. It was, by the Anglo-American Convention of 1818, under the "joint occupancy and use" of citizens of the United States and subjects of Britain (which is to say, the fur companies). This co-occupancy was ended with the Oregon Treaty of 1846.

The major supply route was the York Factory Express between Hudson Bay and Fort Vancouver. Some of the early outposts grew into settlements, communities, and cities. Among the places in British Columbia that began as fur trading posts are Fort St. John (established 1794); Hudson's Hope (1805); Fort Nelson (1805); Fort St. James (1806); Prince George (1807); Kamloops (1812); Fort Langley (1827); Fort Victoria (1843); Yale (1848); and Nanaimo (1853). Fur company posts that became cities in what is now the United States include Vancouver, Washington (Fort Vancouver), formerly the "capital" of Hudson's Bay operations in the Columbia District, Colville, Washington and Walla Walla, Washington (old Fort Nez Percés).

With the amalgamation of the two fur trading companies in 1821, modern-day British Columbia existed in three fur trading departments. The bulk of the central and northern interior was organized into the New Caledonia district, administered from Fort St. James. The interior south of the Thompson River watershed and north of the Columbia was organized into the Columbia District, administered from Fort Vancouver on the lower Columbia River. The northeast corner of the province east of the Rockies, known as the Peace River Block, was attached to the much larger Athabasca District, headquartered in Fort Chipewyan, in present-day Alberta.

Until 1849, these districts were a wholly unorganized area of British North America under the de facto jurisdiction of HBC administrators; however, unlike Rupert's Land to the north and east, the territory was not a concession to the company. Rather, it was simply granted a monopoly to trade with the First Nations inhabitants. All that was changed with the westward extension of American exploration and the concomitant overlapping claims of territorial sovereignty, especially in the southern Columbia Basin (within present day Washington and Oregon). In 1846, the Oregon Treaty divided the territory along the 49th parallel to the Strait of Georgia, with the area south of this boundary (excluding Vancouver Island and the Gulf Islands) transferred to sole American sovereignty. The Colony of Vancouver Island was created in 1849, with Victoria designated as the capital. New Caledonia, as the whole of the mainland rather than just its north-central Interior came to be called, continued to be an unorganized territory of British North America, "administered" by individual HBC trading post managers.

Colony of British Columbia (1858–1866)

With the Fraser Canyon Gold Rush in 1858, an influx of Americans into New Caledonia prompted the colonial office to designate the mainland as the Colony of British Columbia. When news of the Fraser Canyon Gold Rush reached London, Richard Clement Moody was hand-picked by the Colonial Office, under Sir Edward Bulwer-Lytton, to establish British order and to transform the newly established Colony of British Columbia into the British Empire's "bulwark in the farthest west" and "found a second England on the shores of the Pacific". Lytton desired to send to the colony "representatives of the best of British culture, not just a police force": he sought men who possessed "courtesy, high breeding and urbane knowledge of the world" and he decided to send Moody, whom the Government considered to be the "English gentleman and British Officer" at the head of the Royal Engineers, Columbia Detachment.

Moody and his family arrived in British Columbia in December 1858, commanding the Royal Engineers, Columbia Detachment. He was sworn in as the first lieutenant governor of British Columbia and appointed Chief Commissioner of Lands and Works for British Columbia. On the advice of Lytton, Moody hired Robert Burnaby as his personal secretary.

In British Columbia, Moody "wanted to build a city of beauty in the wilderness" and planned his city as an iconic visual metaphor for British dominance, "styled and located with the objective of reinforcing the authority of the crown and of the robe". Subsequent to the enactment of the Pre-emption Act of 1860, Moody settled the Lower Mainland. He selected the site and founded the new capital, New Westminster. He selected the site due to the strategic excellence of its position and the quality of its port. He was also struck by the majestic beauty of the site, writing in his letter to Blackwood,

Lord Lytton "forgot the practicalities of paying for clearing and developing the site and the town" and the efforts of Moody's engineers were continuously hampered by insufficient funds, which, together with the continuous opposition of Governor James Douglas, "made it impossible for Moody's design to be fulfilled".

Moody and the Royal Engineers also built an extensive road network, including what would become Kingsway, connecting New Westminster to False Creek, the North Road between Port Moody and New Westminster, and the Cariboo Road and Stanley Park. He named Burnaby Lake after his private secretary Robert Burnaby and named Port Coquitlam's 400-foot "Mary Hill" after his wife. As part of the surveying effort, several tracts were designated "government reserves", which included Stanley Park as a military reserve (a strategic location in case of an American invasion). The Pre-emption Act did not specify conditions for distributing the land, so large parcels were snapped up by speculators, including  by Moody himself. For this he was criticized by local newspapermen for land grabbing. Moody designed the first coat of arms of British Columbia. Port Moody is named after him. It was established at the end of a trail that connected New Westminster with Burrard Inlet to defend New Westminster from potential attack from the US.

By 1862, the Cariboo Gold Rush, attracting an additional 5000 miners, was underway, and Douglas hastened construction of the Great North Road (commonly known now as the Cariboo Wagon Road) up the Fraser Canyon to the prospecting region around Barkerville. By the time of this gold rush, the character of the colony was changing, as a more stable population of British colonists settled in the region, establishing businesses, opening sawmills, and engaging in fishing and agriculture. With this increased stability, objections to the colony's absentee governor and the lack of responsible government began to be vocalized, led by the influential editor of the New Westminster British Columbian and future premier, John Robson. A series of petitions requesting an assembly were ignored by Douglas and the colonial office until Douglas was eased out of office in 1864. Finally, the colony would have both an assembly and a resident governor.

Later gold rushes
A series of gold rushes in various parts of the province followed, the largest being the Cariboo Gold Rush in 1862, forcing the colonial administration into deeper debt as it struggled to meet the extensive infrastructure needs of far-flung boom communities like Barkerville and Lillooet, which sprang up overnight. The Vancouver Island colony was facing financial crises of its own, and pressure to merge the two eventually succeeded in 1866, when the colony of British Columbia was amalgamated with the Colony of Vancouver Island to form the Colony of British Columbia (1866–1871), which was, in turn, succeeded by the present day province of British Columbia following the Canadian Confederation of 1871.

Rapid growth and development

The Confederation League, including such figures as Amor De Cosmos, John Robson, and Robert Beaven, led the chorus pressing for the colony to join Canada, which had been created out of three British North American colonies in 1867 (the Province of Canada, Nova Scotia and New Brunswick). Several factors motivated this agitation, including the fear of annexation to the United States, the overwhelming debt created by rapid population growth, the need for government-funded services to support this population, and the economic depression caused by the end of the gold rush.

With the agreement by the Canadian government to extend the Canadian Pacific Railway to British Columbia and to assume the colony's debt, British Columbia became the sixth province to join Confederation on July 20, 1871. The borders of the province were not completely settled. The Treaty of Washington sent the Pig War San Juan Islands Border dispute to arbitration in 1871 and in 1903, the province's territory shrank again after the Alaska boundary dispute settled the vague boundary of the Alaska Panhandle.

Population in British Columbia continued to expand as the province's mining, forestry, agriculture, and fishing sectors were developed. Mining activity was particularly notable throughout the Mainland, particularly in the Boundary Country, in the Slocan, in the West Kootenay around Trail, the East Kootenay (the southeast corner of the province), the Fraser Canyon, the Cariboo, the Omineca and the Cassiar, so much so a common epithet for the Mainland, even after provincehood, was "the Gold Colony". Agriculture attracted settlers to the fertile Fraser Valley, and cattle ranchers and later fruit growers came to the drier grasslands of the Thompson River area, the Cariboo, the Chilcotin, and the Okanagan. Forestry drew workers to the lush temperate rainforests of the coast, which was also the locus of a growing fishery.

The completion of the railway in 1885 was a huge boost to the province's economy, facilitating the transportation of the region's considerable resources to the east. The milltown of Granville, known as Gastown, near the mouth of the Burrard Inlet was selected as the terminus of the railway, prompting the incorporation of the city as Vancouver in 1886. The completion of the Port of Vancouver spurred rapid growth, and in less than fifty years the city surpassed Winnipeg, Manitoba, as the largest in Western Canada. The early decades of the province were ones in which issues of land use—specifically, its settlement and development—were paramount. This included expropriation from First Nations people of their land, control over its resources, as well as the ability to trade in some resources (such as fishing).

Establishing a labour force to develop the province was problematic from the start, and British Columbia was the locus of immigration from Europe, China, Japan and India. The influx of a non-European population stimulated resentment from the dominant ethnic groups, resulting in agitation (much of it successful) to restrict the ability of Asian people to immigrate to British Columbia through the imposition of a head tax. This resentment culminated in mob attacks against Chinese and Japanese immigrants in Vancouver in 1887 and 1907. The subsequent Komagata Maru incident in 1914, where hundreds of Indians were denied entry into Vancouver, was also a direct result of the anti-Asian resentment at the time. By 1923, almost all Chinese immigration had been blocked except for merchants, professionals, students and investors.

Meanwhile, the province continued to grow. In 1914, the last spike of a second transcontinental rail line, the Grand Trunk Pacific, linking north-central British Columbia from the Yellowhead Pass through Prince George to Prince Rupert was driven at Fort Fraser. This opened up the North Coast and the Bulkley Valley region to new economic opportunities. What had previously been an almost exclusively fur trade and subsistence economy soon became a locus for forestry, farming, and mining.

In World War I, the province responded strongly to the call to assist the British Empire against its German foes in French and Belgian battlefields. About 55,570 of the 400,000 British Columbian residents, the highest per-capita rate in Canada, responded to the military needs. Horseriders from the province's Interior region and First Nations soldiers made contributions to Vimy Ridge and other battles. About 6,225 men from the province died in combat.

1920s to 1940s

When men returned from the First World War, they discovered the recently enfranchised women of the province voted for the prohibition of liquor in an effort to end the social problems associated with the hard-core drinking in the province was until the war. However, with pressure from veterans, prohibition was quickly relaxed so the "soldier and the working man" could enjoy a drink, but widespread unemployment among veterans was hardened by many of the available jobs being taken by European immigrants and disgruntled veterans organized a range of "soldier parties" to represent their interests, variously named Soldier-Farmer, Soldier-Labour, and Farmer-Labour Parties. These formed the basis of the fractured labour-political spectrum that would generate a host of fringe leftist and rightist parties, including those who would eventually form the Co-operative Commonwealth Federation and the early Social Credit splinter groups.

The advent of prohibition in the United States created opportunities, and many found employment or at least profit in cross-border liquor smuggling. By the end of the 1920s, the end of prohibition in the U.S., combined with the onset of the Great Depression, plunged the province into economic destitution during the 1930s. Compounding the already dire local economic situation, tens of thousands of men from colder parts of Canada swarmed into Vancouver, creating huge hobo jungles around False Creek and the Burrard Inlet rail yards, including the old Canadian Pacific Railway mainline right-of-way through the heart of Downtown Vancouver. Increasingly desperate times led to intense political efforts, an occupation of the main Post Office at Granville and Hastings which was violently put down by the police and an effective imposition of martial law on the docks for almost three years due to the Battle of Ballantyne Pier. A Vancouver contingent for the On-to-Ottawa Trek was organized and seized a train, which was loaded with thousands of men bound for the capital but was met by a Gatling gun straddling train tracks at Mission. All the men were arrested and sent to work camps for the duration of the Depression. There were signs of an economic return towards the end of the 1930s, however, the onset of World War II transformed the national economy and ended the Depression.

British Columbia has long taken advantage of its location on the Pacific Ocean to have close relations with East Asia and South Asia. These relations have often caused friction between cultures which has sometimes escalated into racist animosity towards those of Asian descent. This was manifest during the Second World War when many people of Japanese descent were relocated or interned in the Interior region of the province.

Coalition and the post-war boom

During the Second World War the mainstream BC Liberal and BC Conservative parties united in a formal coalition government under new Liberal leader John Hart, who replaced Duff Pattullo when the latter failed to win a majority in the 1941 election. While the Liberals won the most seats, they actually received fewer votes than the socialist Co-operative Commonwealth Federation (CCF). Pattullo was unwilling to form a coalition with the rival Conservatives led by Royal Maitland and was replaced by Hart, who formed a coalition cabinet made up of five Liberal and three Conservative ministers. The CCF was invited to join the coalition but refused.

The pretext for continuing the coalition after the end of the Second World War was to prevent the CCF, which had won a surprise victory in Saskatchewan in 1944, from ever coming to power in British Columbia. The CCF's popular vote was high enough in the 1945 election that they were likely to have won three-way contests and could have formed government; however, the coalition prevented that by uniting the anti-socialist vote. In the post-war environment the government initiated a series of infrastructure projects, notably the completion of Highway 97 north of Prince George to the Peace River Block, a section called the John Hart Highway and also public hospital insurance.

In 1947 the reins of the Coalition were taken by Byron Ingemar Johnson. The Conservatives had wanted their new leader Herbert Anscomb to be premier, but the Liberals in the Coalition refused. Johnson led the coalition to the highest percentage of the popular vote in British Columbia history (61 percent) in the 1949 election. This victory was attributable to the popularity of his government's spending programmes, despite rising criticism of corruption and abuse of power. During his tenure, major infrastructures continued to expand, such as the agreement with Alcan Aluminum to build the town of Kitimat with an aluminum smelter and the large Kemano Hydro Project. Johnson achieved popularity for flood relief efforts during the 1948 flooding of the Fraser Valley, which was a major blow to that region and to the province's economy.

On February 13, 1950, a Convair B-36B crashed in northern British Columbia after jettisoning a Mark IV atomic bomb. This was the first such nuclear weapon loss in history.

Increasing tension between the Liberal and Conservative coalition partners led the Liberal Party executive to vote to instruct Johnson to terminate the arrangement. Johnson ended the coalition and dropped his Conservative cabinet ministers, including Deputy Premier and Finance minister Herbert Anscomb, precipitating the general election of 1952. A referendum on electoral reform prior to this election had instigated an elimination ballot (similar to a preferential ballot), where voters could select second and third choices. The intent of the ballot, as campaigned for by Liberals and Conservatives, was that their supporters would list the rival party in lieu of the CCF, but this plan backfired when a large group of voters from all major parties, including the CCF, voted for the fringe Social Credit Party, who wound up with the largest number of seats in the House (19), only one seat ahead of the CCF, despite the CCF having 34.3 percent of the vote to Social Credit's 30.18 percent.

The Social Credit Party, led by rebel former Conservative MLA W. A. C. Bennett, formed a minority government backed by the Liberals and Conservatives (with 6 and 4 seats respectively). Bennett began a series of fiscal reforms, preaching a new variety of populism as well as waxing eloquent on progress and development, laying the ground for a second election in 1953 in which the new Bennett regime secured a majority of seats, with 38 percent of the vote. Secure with that majority, Bennett returned the province to the first-past-the-post system thereafter, which is still in use.

1952–1960s

With the election of the Social Credit Party, British Columbia embarked on a phase of rapid economic development. Bennett and his party governed the province for the next twenty years, during which time the government initiated an ambitious programme of infrastructure development, fuelled by a sustained economic boom in the forestry, mining, and energy sectors.

During these two decades, the government nationalized British Columbia Electric and the British Columbia Power Company, as well as smaller electric companies, renaming the entity BC Hydro. West Kootenay Power and Light remained independent of BC Hydro, being owned and operated by Cominco, though tied into the regional power grid. By the end of the 1960s, several major dams had been begun or completed in—among others—the Peace, Columbia, and Nechako River watersheds (the Nechako Diversion to Kemano, was to supply power to the Alcan Inc. aluminum smelter at Kitimat, and was not part of the provincial power grid but privately owned). Major transmission deals were concluded, most notably the Columbia River Treaty between Canada and the United States. The province's economy was also boosted by unprecedented growth in the forest sector, as well as oil and gas development in the province's northeast.

The 1950s and 1960s were also marked by development in the province's transportation infrastructure. In 1960, the government established BC Ferries as a crown corporation, to provide a marine extension of the provincial highway system, also supported by federal grants as being part of the Trans-Canada Highway system. That system was improved and expanded through the construction of new highways and bridges, and paving of existing highways and provincial roads.

Vancouver and Victoria became cultural centres as poets, authors, artists, musicians, as well as dancers, actors, and haute cuisine chefs flocked to its scenery and warmer temperatures, with the cultural and entrepreneurial community bolstered by many Draft dodgers from the United States. Tourism also played a role in the economy. The rise of Japan and other Pacific economies was a boost to British Columbia's economy, primarily because of exports of lumber products and unprocessed coal and trees.

Politically and socially, the 1960s brought a period of significant social ferment. The divide between the political left and right, which had prevailed in the province since the Depression and the rise of the labour movement, sharpened as so-called free enterprise parties coalesced into the de facto coalition represented by Social Credit—in opposition to the social democratic New Democratic Party (NDP), the successor to the Co-operative Commonwealth Federation. As the province's economy blossomed, so did labour-management tensions. Tensions emerged, also, from the counterculture movement of the late 1960s, of which Vancouver and Nanaimo were centres. The conflict between hippies and Vancouver mayor Tom Campbell was particularly legendary, culminating in the Gastown riots of 1971. By the end of the decade, with social tensions and dissatisfaction with the status quo rising, the Bennett government's achievements could not stave off its growing unpopularity.

1970s and 1980s

On August 27, 1969, the Social Credit Party was re-elected in a general election for what would be Bennett's final term in power. At the start of the 1970s, the economy was quite strong because of rising coal prices and an increase in annual allowable cuts in the forestry sector, but BC Hydro reported its first loss, which was the beginning of the end for Bennett and the Social Credit Party.

The Socreds were forced from power in the August 1972 election, paving the way for a provincial NDP government under Dave Barrett. Under Barrett, the large provincial surplus soon became a deficit, although changes to the accounting system makes it likely some of the deficit was carried over from the previous Social Credit regime and its "two sets of books", as W. A. C. Bennett had once referred to his system of fiscal management. The brief three-year ("Thousand Days") period of NDP governance brought several lasting changes to the province, most notably the creation of the Agricultural Land Reserve, intended to protect farmland from redevelopment, and the Insurance Corporation of British Columbia, a crown corporation charged with a monopoly on providing single-payer basic automobile insurance.

Perceptions the government had instituted reforms either too swiftly or that were too far-reaching, coupled with growing labour disruptions led to the ouster of the NDP in the 1975 general election. Social Credit, under W.A.C. Bennett's son, Bill Bennett, was returned to office. Under the younger Bennett's government, 85 percent of the province's land base was transferred from Government Reserve to management by the Ministry of Forests, reporting of deputy ministers was centralized to the Premier's Office, and NDP-instigated social programs were rolled back, with then-human resources minister infamously demonstrating a golden shovel to highlight his welfare policy, although the new-era Social Credit Party also reinforced and backed certain others instigated by the NDP—notably the creation of the Resort Municipality of Whistler, whose special status including Sunday drinking, then an anomaly in BC.

Also during the "MiniWac" regime (a reference to his father's acronym, W. A. C.) certain money-losing Crown-owned assets were "privatized" in a mass giveaway of shares in the British Columbia Resources Investment Corporation, "BCRIC", with the "Brick shares" soon becoming near-worthless. Towards the end of his tenure in power, Bennett oversaw the completion of several megaprojects meant to stimulate the economy and win votes – unlike most right-wing parties, British Columbia's Social Credit actively practiced government stimulation of the economy. Most notable of these was the winning of a world's fair for Vancouver, which came in the form of Expo 86, to which was tied the construction of the Coquihalla Highway and Vancouver's SkyTrain system. The Coquihalla Highway project became the subject of a scandal after revelations the premier's brother bought large tracts of land needed for the project before it was announced to the public, and also because of graft investigations of the huge cost overruns on the project. Both investigations were derailed in the media by a still further scandal, the Doman Scandal, in which the premier and millionaire backer Herb Doman were investigated for insider-trading and securities fraud. Nonetheless, the Socreds were re-elected in 1979 under Bennett, who led the party until 1986.

As the province entered a sustained recession, Bennett's popularity and media image were in decline. On April 1, 1983, Premier Bennett overstayed his constitutional limits of power by exceeding the legal tenure of a government, and the lieutenant governor, Henry Pybus Bell-Irving, was forced to call Bennett to Government House to resolve the impasse, and an election was called for April 30, while in the meantime government cheques were covered by special emergency warrants as the Executive Council no longer had signing authority because of the constitutional crisis. Campaigning on a platform of moderation, Bennett won an unexpected majority.

After several weeks of silence in the aftermath, a sitting of the House was finally called and in the speech from the throne, Social Credit instituted a programme of fiscal cutbacks dubbed "restraint", which had been a buzzword for moderation during the campaign. The programme included cuts to "motherhood" issues of the left, including the human rights branch, the offices of the Ombudsman and Rentalsman, women's programs, environmental and cultural programs, while still supplying mass capital infusions to corporate British Columbia. This sparked a backlash, with tens of thousands of people in the streets the next day after the budget speech, and through the course of a summer repeated large demonstrations of up to 100,000 people.

This became known as the 1983 Solidarity Crisis, from the name of the Solidarity Coalition, a huge grassroots opposition movement mobilized, consisting of organized labour and community groups, with the British Columbia Federation of Labour forming a separate organization of unions, Operation Solidarity, under the direction of Jack Munro, then-president of the International Woodworkers of America (IWA), the most powerful of the province's resource unions. Tens of thousands participated in protests and many felt a general strike would be the inevitable result unless the government backed down from its policies they had claimed were only about restraint and not about recrimination against the NDP and the left. Just as a strike at Pacific Press ended, which had limited the political management of the public agenda by the publishers of the province's major papers, the movement collapsed after an apparent deal was struck by union leader and IWA president, Jack Munro and Premier Bennett.

A tense winter of blockades at various job sites around the province ensued, as among the new laws were those enabling non-union labour to work on large projects and other sensitive labour issues, with companies from Alberta and other provinces brought in to compete with union-scale British Columbia companies. Despite the tension, Bennett's last few years in power were relatively peaceful as economic and political momentum grew on the megaprojects associated with Expo, and Bennett was to end his career by hosting Prince Charles and Lady Diana on their visit to open Expo 86. His retirement being announced, a Social Credit convention was scheduled for the Whistler Resort, which came down to a three-way shooting match between Bud Smith, the Premier's right-hand man but an unelected official, Social Credit party grande dame Grace McCarthy, and the charismatic but eccentric Bill Vander Zalm.

Bill Vander Zalm became the new Social Credit leader when Smith threw his support to him rather than see McCarthy win, and led the party to victory in the election later that year. Vander Zalm was later involved in a conflict of interest scandal following the sale of Fantasy Gardens, a Christian and Dutch culture theme park built by the Premier, to Tan Yu, a Filipino Chinese gambling kingpin. There were also concerns over Yu's application to the government for a bank licence, and lurid stories from flamboyant realtor Faye Leung of a party in the "Howard Hughes Suite" on the top two floors of the Bayshore Inn, where Tan Yu had been staying, with reports of a bag of money in a brown paper bag passed from Yu to Vander Zalm during the goings-on. These scandals forced Vander Zalm's resignation, and Rita Johnston became premier of the province. Johnston presided over the end of Social Credit power, calling an election which reduced the party's caucus to only two seats, and the revival of the long-defunct British Columbia Liberal Party as Opposition to the victorious NDP under former Vancouver mayor Mike Harcourt.

In 1988, David Lam was appointed as British Columbia's twenty-fifth lieutenant governor, and was the province's first lieutenant governor of Chinese origin.

1990s to present

Johnston lost the 1991 general election to the NDP, under the leadership of Mike Harcourt, a former mayor of Vancouver. The NDP's unprecedented creation of new parkland and protected areas was popular and helped boost the province's growing tourism sector, although the economy continued to struggle against the backdrop of a weak resource economy. Housing starts and an expanded service sector saw growth overall through the decade, despite political turmoil. Harcourt ended up resigning over "Bingogate"—a political scandal involving the funnelling of charity bingo receipts into party coffers in certain ridings. Harcourt was not implicated, but he resigned nonetheless in respect of constitutional conventions calling for leaders under suspicion to step aside. Glen Clark, a former president of the BC Federation of Labour, was chosen the new leader of the NDP, which won a second term in 1996. More scandals dogged the party, most notably the fast ferry scandal involving the province trying to develop the shipbuilding industry in British Columbia. An allegation (never substantiated) that the premier had received a favour in return for granting a gaming licence led to Clark's resignation as premier. He was succeeded on an interim basis by Dan Miller who was in turn followed by Ujjal Dosanjh following a leadership convention.

In the 2001 provincial election, Gordon Campbell's Liberals defeated the NDP, gaining 77 out of 79 total seats in the provincial legislature. Campbell instituted various reforms and removed some of the NDP's policies including scrapping the "fast ferries" project, lowering income taxes, and the controversial sale of BC Rail to Canadian National Railway. Campbell was also the subject of criticism after he was arrested for driving under the influence during a vacation in Hawaii, but he still managed to lead his party to victory in the 2005 provincial election against a substantially strengthened NDP opposition. Campbell won a third term in the 2009 provincial election, marking the first time in 23 years a premier has been elected to a third term.

The province won a bid to host the 2010 Winter Olympics in Vancouver and Whistler. As promised in his 2002 re-election campaign, Vancouver Mayor Larry Campbell staged a non-binding civic referendum regarding the hosting of the Olympics. In February 2003, Vancouver's residents voted in a referendum accepting the responsibilities of the host city should it win its bid. Sixty-four percent of residents voted in favour of hosting the games.

After the Olympic joy had faded, Campbell's popularity started to fall. His management style, the implementation of the Harmonized Sales Tax (HST) against election promises and the cancelling of the BC Rail corruption trial led to low approval ratings and loss of caucus support. He resigned in November 2010 and called on the party to elect a new leader.

In early 2011, former deputy premier Christy Clark became leader of the Liberal Party. Though she was not a sitting MLA, she went on to win the seat left vacant by Campbell. For the next two years, she attempted to distance herself from the unpopularity of Campbell and forge an image for the upcoming 2013 election. Among her early accomplishments were raising the minimum wage, creating a new statutory holiday in February called "Family Day", and pushing the development of BC's liquefied natural gas industry. In the lead-up to the 2013 election, the Liberals lagged behind the NDP by a double-digit gap in the polls, but were able to achieve a surprise victory on election night, winning a majority and making Clark the first woman to lead a party to victory in a general election in BC. While Clark lost her seat to NDP candidate David Eby, she later won a by-election in the riding of Westside-Kelowna. Her government went on to balance the budget, implement changes to liquor laws and continue with the question of the proposed Enbridge Northern Gateway Pipelines.

In the 2017 election, the NDP formed a minority government with the support of the Green Party through a confidence and supply agreement. The NDP and Green caucuses together controlled 44 seats, compared to the Liberals' 43. On July 18, 2017, NDP leader John Horgan was sworn in as the premier of British Columbia. He was the province's first NDP premier in 16 years. Clark resigned shortly thereafter, and Andrew Wilkinson was voted to become leader of the BC Liberals. In late 2020, Horgan called an early election. In the 2020 British Columbia general election, the NDP won 57 seats and formed a majority government, making Horgan the first NDP premier to be re-elected in the province. Wilkinson resigned as the leader of the BC Liberals two days later.

British Columbia was significantly affected by demographic changes within Canada and around the world. Vancouver (and to a lesser extent some other parts of British Columbia) was a major destination for many of the immigrants from Hong Kong who left the former UK colony (either temporarily or permanently) in the years immediately prior to its handover to China. British Columbia has also been a significant destination for internal Canadian migrants. This has been the case throughout recent decades, because of its natural environment, mild climate and relaxed lifestyle, but has been particularly true during periods of economic growth. British Columbia has moved from approximately 10 percent of Canada's population in 1971 to approximately 13 percent in 2006. Trends of urbanization mean the Greater Vancouver area now includes 51 percent of the province's population, followed by Greater Victoria with 8 percent. These two metropolitan regions have traditionally dominated the demographics of BC.

By 2018, housing prices in Vancouver were the second-least affordable in the world, behind only Hong Kong. Many experts point to evidence of money-laundering from mainland China as a contributing factor. The high price of residential real estate has led to the implementation of an empty homes tax, a housing speculation and vacancy tax, and a foreign buyers' tax on housing.

The net number of people coming to BC from other provinces in 2016 was almost four times larger than in 2012. BC was the largest net recipient of interprovincial migrants in Canada in the first quarter of 2016 with half of the 5,000 people coming from Alberta.

By 2021, the COVID-19 pandemic had had a major effect on the province, with over 2,000 deaths and 250,000 confirmed cases. However, the COVID-19 vaccine reduced the spread of the virus, with 78 percent of people in BC over the age of five having been fully vaccinated.

In 2021, the unmarked gravesites of hundreds of Indigenous children were discovered at three former Indian residential schools (Kamloops, St. Eugene's Mission, Kuper Island).

Demographics

Population

Statistics Canada's 2021 Canadian census recorded a population of 5,000,879 — making British Columbia Canada's third-most populous province after Ontario and Quebec.

Cities

Half of all British Columbians live in the Metro Vancouver Regional District, which includes Vancouver, Surrey, Burnaby, Richmond, Coquitlam, Langley (district municipality), Delta, North Vancouver (district municipality), Maple Ridge, New Westminster, Port Coquitlam, North Vancouver (city), West Vancouver, Port Moody, Langley (city), White Rock, Pitt Meadows, Bowen Island, Anmore, Lions Bay, and Belcarra, with adjacent unincorporated areas (including the University Endowment Lands) represented in the regional district as the electoral area known as Greater Vancouver Electoral Area A. The metropolitan area has seventeen Indian reserves, but they are outside of the regional district's jurisdiction and are not represented in its government.

The second largest concentration of British Columbia population is at the southern tip of Vancouver Island, which is made up of the 13 municipalities of Greater Victoria, Victoria, Saanich, Esquimalt, Oak Bay, View Royal, Highlands, Colwood, Langford, Central Saanich/Saanichton, North Saanich, Sidney, Metchosin, Sooke, which are part of the Capital Regional District. The metropolitan area also includes several Indian reserves (the governments of which are not part of the regional district). Almost half of the Vancouver Island population is in Greater Victoria.

Cultural origins
British Columbia is the most diverse province in Canada; as of 2016, the province had the highest proportion of visible minorities in the country. The five largest pan-ethnic groups in the province are Europeans (64 percent), East Asians (15 percent), South Asians (8 percent), Aboriginals (6 percent) and Southeast Asians (4 percent).

Religion
According to the 2021 census, religious groups in British Columbia included:
Irreligion (2,559,250 persons or 52.1%)
Christianity (1,684,870 persons or 34.3%)
Sikhism (290,870 persons or 5.9%)
Islam (125,915 persons or 2.6%)
Buddhism (83,860 persons or 1.7%)
Hinduism (81,320 persons or 1.7%)
Judaism (26,850 persons or 0.5%)
Indigenous spirituality (11,570 persons or 0.2%)
Other (51,440 persons or 1.0%)

Language

As of the 2021 Canadian Census, the ten most spoken languages in the province included English (4,753,280 or 96.69%), French (327,350 or 6.66%), Punjabi (315,000 or 6.41%), Mandarin (312,625 or 6.36%), Cantonese (246,045 or 5.01%), Spanish (143,900 or 2.93%), Hindi (134,950 or 2.75%), Tagalog (133,780 or 2.72%), German (84,325 or 1.72%), and Korean (69,935 or 1.42%). The question on knowledge of languages allows for multiple responses.

Of the 4,648,055 population counted by the 2016 census, 4,598,415 people completed the section about language. Of these, 4,494,995 gave singular responses to the question regarding their first language. The languages most commonly reported were the following:

While these languages all reflect the last centuries of colonialism and recent immigration, British Columbia is home to 34 Indigenous languages. They are spoken by about 6000 people in total, with 4000 people fluent in their Indigenous languages. They are members of the province's First Nations. One of the main Indigenous languages in BC is Kwakʼwala, the language of the Kwakwakaʼwakw First Nations.

Economy

BC's economy is diverse, with service-producing industries accounting for the largest portion of the province's GDP. It is the terminus of two transcontinental railways, and the site of 27 major marine cargo and passenger terminals. Though less than 5 percent of its vast  land is arable, the province is agriculturally rich (particularly in the Fraser and Okanagan valleys), because of milder weather near the coast and in certain sheltered southern valleys. Its climate encourages outdoor recreation and tourism, though its economic mainstay has long been resource extraction, principally logging, farming, and mining. Vancouver, the province's largest city, serves as the headquarters of many western-based natural resource companies. It also benefits from a strong housing market and a per capita income well above the national average. While the coast of British Columbia and some valleys in the south-central part of the province have mild weather, the majority of its land mass experiences a cold-winter-temperate climate similar to the rest of Canada. The Northern Interior region has a subarctic climate with very cold winters. The climate of Vancouver is by far the mildest winter climate of the major Canadian cities, with nighttime January temperatures averaging above the freezing point.

British Columbia has a history of being a resource dominated economy, centred on the forestry industry but also with fluctuating importance in mining. Employment in the resource sector has fallen steadily as a percentage of employment, and new jobs are mostly in the construction and retail/service sectors. It now has the highest percentage of service industry jobs in the west, constituting 72 percent of industry (compared to 60 percent Western Canadian average). The largest section of this employment is in finance, insurance, real estate and corporate management; however, many areas outside of metropolitan areas are still heavily reliant on resource extraction. With its film industry known as Hollywood North, the Vancouver region is the third-largest feature film production location in North America, after Los Angeles and New York City.

The economic history of British Columbia is replete with tales of dramatic upswings and downswings, and this boom and bust pattern has influenced the politics, culture and business climate of the province. Economic activity related to mining in particular has widely fluctuated with changes in commodity prices over time, with documented costs to community health.

In 2020, British Columbia had the third-largest GDP in Canada, with a GDP of $309 billion and a GDP per capita of $60,090. British Columbia's debt-to-GDP ratio is edging up to 15.0 percent in fiscal year 2019–20, and it is expected to reach 16.1 percent by 2021–22. British Columbia's economy experienced strong growth in recent years with a total growth rate of 9.6% from 2017 to 2021, a growth rate that was second in the country.

Government and politics

The lieutenant governor, Janet Austin, is the Crown's representative in the province. During the absence of the lieutenant governor, the Governor in Council (federal Cabinet) may appoint an administrator to execute the duties of the office. This is usually the chief justice of British Columbia. British Columbia is divided into regional districts as a means to better enable municipalities and rural areas to work together at a regional level.

British Columbia has an 87-member elected Legislative Assembly, elected by the plurality voting system, though from 2003 to 2009 there was significant debate about switching to a single transferable vote system called BC-STV. The government of the day appoints ministers for various portfolios, what are officially part of the Executive Council, of whom the premier is chair.

The province is currently governed by the British Columbia New Democratic Party (BC NDP) under Premier David Eby. The 2017 provincial election saw the Liberal Party take 43 seats, the NDP take 41, and the British Columbia Green Party take 3. No party met the minimum of 44 seats for a majority, therefore leading to the first minority government since 1953. Following the election, the Greens entered into negotiations with both the Liberals and NDP, eventually announcing they would support the current NDP minority. Previously, the right-of-centre British Columbia Liberal Party governed the province for 16 years between 2001 and 2017, and won the largest landslide election in British Columbia history in 2001, with 77 of 79 seats. The legislature became more evenly divided between the Liberals and NDP following the 2005 (46 Liberal seats of 79) and 2009 (49 Liberal seats of 85) provincial elections. The NDP and its predecessor the Co-operative Commonwealth Federation (CCF) have been the main opposition force to right-wing parties since the 1930s and have ruled with majority governments in 1972–1975 and 1991–2001. The Green Party plays a larger role in the politics of British Columbia than Green parties do in most other jurisdictions in Canada. After a breakthrough election in 2001 (12.39 percent), the party's vote share declined (2005 – 9.17 percent, 2009 – 8.09 percent, 2013 – 8.13 percent) before increasing again to a record high of 16.84 percent at the 2017 election.

The British Columbia Liberal Party is not related to the federal Liberal Party and does not share the same ideology. Instead, the BC Liberal party is a rather diverse coalition, made up of the remnants of the Social Credit Party, many federal Liberals, federal Conservatives, and those who would otherwise support right-of-centre or free enterprise parties. Historically, there have commonly been third parties present in the legislature (including the Liberals themselves from 1952 to 1975); the BC Green Party are the current third party in British Columbia, with three seats in the legislature.

Prior to the rise of the Liberal Party, British Columbia's main political party was the British Columbia Social Credit Party which ruled British Columbia for 20 continuous years. While sharing some ideology with the current Liberal government, they were more right-wing although undertook nationalization of various important monopolies, notably BC Hydro and BC Ferries.

British Columbia is known for having politically active labour unions who have traditionally supported the NDP or its predecessor, the CCF.

British Columbia's political history is typified by scandal and a cast of colourful characters, beginning with various colonial-era land scandals and abuses of power by early officials (such as those that led to McGowan's War in 1858–59). Notable scandals in Social Credit years included the Robert Bonner Affair and the Fantasy Gardens scandal which forced Premier Bill Vander Zalm to resign and ended the Social Credit era. NDP scandals included Bingogate, which brought down NDP Premier Mike Harcourt, and the alleged scandal named Casinogate which drove NDP Premier Glen Clark to resign. A variety of scandals plagued the 2001–2017 Liberal government, including Premier Gordon Campbell's arrest for drunk driving in Maui and the resignation of various cabinet ministers because of conflict-of-interest allegations. A raid on the Parliament Buildings on December 28, 2003, in Victoria, including the Premier's Office, resulted in charges only for ministerial aides, although key cabinet members from the time have since resigned. The case, currently in preliminary hearings in the courts and relating to the sale of BC Rail to CN Rail, may not reach trial because of the mass of evidence and various procedural problems. Campbell eventually resigned in late 2010 due to opposition to his government's plan to introduce a Harmonized Sales Tax (HST) and was replaced by Christy Clark as premier in a 2011 BC Liberal leadership election.

British Columbia is underrepresented in the Senate of Canada, leading Premier Christy Clark to refuse to cooperate with the federal government's reforms for senate appointments to be made based on the recommendations of a new advisory board that would use non-partisan criteria. Hours after that plan was unveiled in Ottawa on December 3, 2015, Clark issued a statement that it did "not address what's been wrong with the Senate since the beginning".

The imbalance in representation in that House is apparent when considering population size. The six senators from BC constitute only one for every 775,000 people vs. one for every 75,000 in P.E.I. which has four senators. Nova Scotia and New Brunswick have much smaller populations than BC, yet each has ten senators according to a Global News summary. Correcting this imbalance would require a constitutional amendment, but that is unlikely to be supported by the Atlantic provinces.

Official symbols

The government of British Columbia has designated several official symbols:

 Flag: Flag of British Columbia
 Coat of arms: Coat of arms of British Columbia
 Floral emblem: Pacific dogwood
 Mineral emblem: Jade
 Tree emblem: Western red cedar
 Bird emblem: Steller's jay
 Mammal emblem: "Spirit" or Kermode bear
 Fish emblem: Pacific salmon
 Tartan emblem: British Columbia Tartan

Transportation
Transportation played a huge role in British Columbia's history. The Rocky Mountains and the ranges west of them constituted a significant obstacle to overland travel until the completion of the transcontinental railway in 1885. The Peace River Canyon through the Rocky Mountains was the route the earliest explorers and fur traders used. Fur trade routes were only marginally used for access to British Columbia through the mountains. Travel from the rest of Canada before 1885 meant the difficulty of overland travel via the United States, around Cape Horn or overseas from Asia. Nearly all travel and freight to and from the region occurred via the Pacific Ocean, primarily through the ports of Victoria and New Westminster.

Until the 1930s, rail was the only means of overland travel to and from the rest of Canada; travellers using motor vehicles needed to journey through the United States. With the construction of the Inter-Provincial Highway in 1932 (now known as the Crowsnest Pass Highway), and later the Trans-Canada Highway, road transportation evolved into the preferred mode of overland travel to and from the rest of the country.

, the number of electric vehicles sold in British Columbia (as a percentage of total vehicle sales) was the highest of any Canadian province or U.S. state.

Roads and highways

Because of its size and rugged, varying topography, British Columbia requires thousands of kilometres of provincial highways to connect its communities. British Columbia's roads systems were notoriously poorly maintained and dangerous until a concentrated programme of improvement was initiated in the 1950s and 1960s. There are now freeways in Greater Victoria, the Lower Mainland, and Central Interior of the province. Much of the rest of the province, where traffic volumes are generally low, is accessible by well-maintained generally high-mobility two-lane arterial highways with additional passing lanes in mountainous areas and usually only a few stop-controlled intersections outside the main urban areas.

A couple of busy intercity corridors outside Greater Vancouver feature more heavily signalized limited-mobility arterial highways that are mostly four-lane and often divided by portable median traffic barriers. Numerous traffic lights operate in place of interchanges on both arterials as long-term cost-cutting measures. Signalization along both these highways is heaviest through urban areas and along inter-urban sections where traffic volumes are similar to and sometimes higher than the freeways, but where funding is not available for upgrades to interchanges or construction of high-mobility alternative routes or bypasses. The building and maintenance of provincial highways is the responsibility of the British Columbia Ministry of Transportation and Infrastructure.

There are only five major routes to the rest of Canada. From south to north they are: BC Highway 3 through the Crowsnest Pass, the Vermilion Pass (Highway 93 in both British Columbia and Alberta), the Kicking Horse Pass, the latter being used by the Trans-Canada Highway entering Alberta through Banff National Park, the Yellowhead Highway (16) through Jasper National Park, and Highway 2 through Dawson Creek. There are also several highway crossings to the adjoining American states of Washington, Idaho, and Montana. The longest highway is Highway 97, running  from the British Columbia-Washington border at Osoyoos north to Watson Lake, Yukon and which includes the British Columbia portion of the Alaska Highway.

Public transit

Prior to 1979, surface public transit in the Vancouver and Victoria metropolitan areas was administered by BC Hydro, the provincially owned electricity utility. Subsequently, the province established BC Transit to oversee and operate all municipal transportation systems. In 1998, the Greater Vancouver Transportation Authority, now TransLink, a separate authority for routes within the Greater Vancouver Regional District, was established. Some smaller island communities, such as Gabriola Island and, formerly, Pender Island operate routes independent of BC Transit or TransLink. BC Transit has recently expanded to provide intercity routes, particularly in the Northern region of British Columbia. Other intercity routes were introduced connecting southern communities in preparation of the cancellation of Greyhound Canada's pullout from Western Canada, though options for intercity bus travel are still extremely limited.

Public transit in British Columbia consists mainly of diesel buses, although Vancouver is also serviced by a fleet of trolley buses. Several experimental buses are being tested such as hybrid buses that have both gasoline and electric engines. Additionally, there are CNG-fuelled buses being tested and used in Nanaimo and Kamloops systems. British Columbia also tested a fleet of Hydrogen-fuelled buses for the Vancouver-Whistler Winter Olympics in 2010. TransLink operates SkyTrain, an automated metro system serving the cities of Vancouver, Burnaby, New Westminster, Surrey, Richmond, Coquitlam, and Port Moody. In 2009, the Canada Line SkyTrain was completed, linking Vancouver International Airport and the city of Richmond to downtown Vancouver bringing the total to three operating metro lines.

A new extension to Coquitlam and Port Moody (the Evergreen Extension of the Millennium Line) was completed in December 2016. Construction of an extension of the Millennium Line westwards through Vancouver to Arbutus Street began in February 2021, with future plans to extend the line farther west from Arbutus station to the University of British Columbia. Fare gates have been added to all existing stations, though in the past, SkyTrain used a proof of payment honour system. In the capital city of Victoria, BC Transit and the provincial government's infrastructure ministry are working together to create a bus rapid transit from the Westshore communities to downtown Victoria. In Kamloops, there is a bus rapid transit GPS trial underway to see how bus rapid transit affects smaller cities, rather than larger ones, like Victoria and Vancouver.

Rail

Rail development expanded greatly in the decades after the Canadian Pacific Railway was completed, in 1885, and was the chief mode of long-distance surface transportation until the expansion and improvement of the provincial highways system began in the 1950s. Two major routes through the Yellowhead Pass competed with the Canadian Pacific Railway – the Grand Trunk Pacific, terminating at Prince Rupert, and the Canadian Northern Railway, terminating at Vancouver.

The British Columbia Electric Railway provided rail services in Victoria and Vancouver between the nineteenth century and mid twentieth century.

The Pacific Great Eastern line supplemented this service, providing a north–south route between interior resource communities and the coast. The Pacific Great Eastern (later known as British Columbia Railway and now owned by Canadian National Railway) connects Fort St James, Fort Nelson, and Tumbler Ridge with North Vancouver. The E&N Railway, rebranded as Southern Railway of Vancouver Island, formerly served the commercial and passenger train markets of Vancouver Island. Service along the route is now minimal. Vancouver Island was also host to the last logging railway in North America until its closure in 2017.

Current passenger services in British Columbia are limited. Via Rail Canada operates 10 long-distance trains per week on two lines. Local services are limited to two regions, with TransLink providing rapid transit and commuter services in the Lower Mainland and by the Seton Lake Indian Band South of Lillooet with the Kaoham Shuttle. Amtrak runs international passenger service between Vancouver, Seattle, and intermediate points.

Several heritage railways operate within the province, including the White Pass & Yukon Route that runs between Alaska and the Yukon via British Columbia.

Water

BC Ferries was established as a provincial crown corporation in 1960 to provide passenger and vehicle ferry service between Vancouver Island and the Lower Mainland as a cheaper and more reliable alternative to the service operated by the Canadian Pacific Railway and other private operators. It now operates 25 routes among the islands of British Columbia, as well as between the islands and the mainland. Ferry service to Washington is offered by the Washington State Ferries (between Sidney and Anacortes) and Black Ball Transport (between Victoria and Port Angeles, Washington). Ferry service over inland lakes and rivers is provided by the Ministry of Transportation and Infrastructure. Various other coastal ferries are operated privately.

Commercial ocean transport is of vital importance. Major ports are at Vancouver, Roberts Bank (near Tsawwassen), Prince Rupert, and Victoria.

Vancouver, Victoria, and Prince Rupert are also major ports of call for cruise ships. In 2007, a large maritime container port was opened in Prince Rupert with an inland sorting port in Prince George.

Air

There are over 200 airports throughout British Columbia, the major ones being the Vancouver International Airport, the Victoria International Airport, the Kelowna International Airport, and the Abbotsford International Airport, the first three of which each served over 1,000,000 passengers in 2005. , Vancouver International Airport is the 2nd busiest airport in the country and the second biggest International Gateway on the west coast (after Los Angeles) with an estimated 26.4 million travellers passing through in 2019.

Arts and culture

Visual arts

The earliest known visual art produced in the Pacific Northwest, and what would become British Columbia, was by First Nations such as the Coast Salish, Haida, Heiltsuk, and Tsimshian, among others. Such Indigenous work comes particularly in the form of woodcarving, as seen in totem poles, transformation masks, and canoes, as well as textile arts like Chilkat weaving and button blankets. Traditional Indigenous art of the Pacific Northwest is typically distinguished by the formline style, which is defined as "continuous, flowing, curvilinear lines that turn, swell and diminish in a prescribed manner. They are used for figure outlines, internal design elements and in abstract compositions."

Western styles and forms were introduced to the region through the establishment of British North American settlements in the late 18th century. Notable English-Canadian artists of 19th and early 20th century British Columbia include architect Francis Rattenbury, designer James Blomfield, and painter Emily Carr.

Vancouver’s art scene was dominated by lyrical abstraction and surrealist landscape painting in the mid-20th century through such artists as B. C. Binning, Jack Shadbolt, Gordon A. Smith, Takao Tanabe, Don Jarvis, and Toni Onley. In the following decades, the city would undergo more artistic diversification with the emergence of conceptual art, communication art, video art, and performance art.

The Vancouver School of conceptual photography encompasses a cohort of Vancouver-based artists who gained notoriety in the 1980s. This school is generally considered to include artists Jeff Wall, Ian Wallace, Ken Lum, Roy Arden, Stan Douglas, and Rodney Graham.

Vancouver maintains roughly 350 works of outdoor public art. Some notable works include A-maze-ing Laughter, Digital Orca, Girl in a Wetsuit, Angel of Victory, The Birds, and the Brockton Point totem poles.

Performing arts

British Columbia is home to the Vancouver Opera, the City Opera of Vancouver, Ballet BC, contemporary dance companies Holy Body Tattoo, Kidd Pivot, Mascall Dance Society, and butoh dance troupe Kokoro Dance. It is also the home province for a plethora of independent theatre companies, including the Arts Club Theatre Company, the Shakespearean Bard on the Beach, and Theatre Under the Stars. Performing arts venues include the Queen Elizabeth Theatre, the Orpheum Theatre, and the Royal Theatre, among others.

Music

British Columbia is the third largest music-producing province in Canada and the local music industry generates an estimated yearly revenue of $265million. The province is home to the Vancouver Symphony Orchestra, the Okanagan Symphony Orchestra, the Vancouver Metropolitan Orchestra, the Vancouver Youth Symphony Orchestra, the Richmond Delta Youth Orchestra, and the Victoria Symphony. Some important popular music acts include bands such as Spirit of the West, Theory of a Deadman, Trooper, Gob, and The New Pornographers, and solo artists such as Bryan Adams, Carly Rae Jepsen, Mac DeMarco, Michael Bublé, Nelly Furtado, and Diana Krall. Music festivals include the Squamish Valley Music Festival, Shambhala Music Festival, and Pemberton Music Festival.

Cuisine

British Columbian cuisine is commonly associated with healthy living, fusion, fresh local ingredients, and innovation. It can be divided into two broadly-defined traditions: cuisine associated with the west coast, which incorporates a variety of seafood elements, and cuisine associated with the interior of the province, which embraces local game meat, farm-to-table produce, and methods of curing and smoking. Seafood is an important staple of the province's local food culture due to its proximity to the Pacific Ocean, as well as the region's numerous rivers and lakes. BC is known for several unique dishes and is a producer of fruit, wine, and cheese.

Seafoods of British Columbia include sushi (BC roll, dynamite roll, California roll), dungeness crab (boiled, tacos), spot prawns, wild pacific salmon (smoked, candied, teriyaki, chowder, sandwich) , and halibut (baked, lemon ginger), as well as delicacies like white sturgeon caviar and geoduck

British Columbia is also home to numerous unique non-seafood culinary staples. Some dishes include Doukhobour borscht, Salt Spring Island lamb, Japadog street food, and Butter chicken pizza. Some unique pastries include apple cranberry cinnamon buns, Nanaimo bars, and Victoria creams. British Columbia also produces several distinct local cheeses, such as kabritt, Castle Blue, and Comox Brie. The London Fog tea latte was invented in Vancouver and remains a popular beverage among coffee shops in the Pacific Northwest and Western Canada; it is referred to as a "Vancouver Fog" in Scotland.

The Okanagan produces many unique fruits originating from the region, including Ambrosia and Spartan apples, Stella and Skeena cherries, and Corontation grapes. Other fruits grown in the province include peaches, pears, plums, apricots, strawberries, blackberries, cranberries, and loganberries.

British Columbia is renowned for its wine production. The primary wine-producing regions include the Okanagan, the Similkameen Valley, Vancouver Island, the Gulf Islands, and the Fraser Valley. As of November 2014, there are 280 licensed grape wineries and 929 vineyards.

Outdoor life and athletics

Given its varied mountainous terrain and its coasts, lakes, rivers, and forests, British Columbia has long been enjoyed for pursuits like hiking and camping, rock climbing and mountaineering, hunting and fishing.

Water sports, both motorized and non-motorized, are enjoyed in many places. Sea kayaking opportunities abound on the British Columbia coast with its fjords. Whitewater rafting and kayaking are popular on many inland rivers. Sailing and sailboarding are widely enjoyed.

In winter, cross-country and telemark skiing are much enjoyed, and in recent decades high-quality downhill skiing has been developed in the Coast Mountain range and the Rockies, as well as in the southern areas of the Shuswap Highlands and the Columbia Mountains. Snowboarding has mushroomed in popularity since the early 1990s. The 2010 Winter Olympics downhill events were held in Whistler Blackcomb area of the province, while the indoor events were conducted in the Vancouver area.

In Vancouver and Victoria (as well as some other cities), opportunities for joggers and bicyclists have been developed. Cross-country bike touring has been popular since the ten-speed bike became available many years ago. Since the advent of the more robust mountain bike, trails in more rugged and wild places have been developed for them. A 2016 poll on global biking website Pinkbike rated BC as the top destination mountain bikers would like to ride. Some of the province's retired rail beds have been converted and maintained for hiking, biking, and cross-country skiing. Longboarding is also a popular activity because of the hilly geography of the region.

Horseback riding is enjoyed by many British Columbians. Opportunities for trail riding, often into especially scenic areas, have been established for tourists in numerous areas of the province.

British Columbia also has strong participation levels in many other sports, including golf, tennis, soccer, hockey, Canadian football, rugby union, lacrosse, baseball, softball, basketball, curling, disc golf, Ultimate and figure skating. British Columbia has produced many outstanding athletes, especially in aquatic and winter sports.

Consistent with both increased tourism and increased participation in diverse recreations by British Columbians has been the proliferation of lodges, chalets, bed and breakfasts, motels, hotels, fishing camps, and park-camping facilities in recent decades.

In certain areas, there are businesses, non-profit societies, or municipal governments dedicated to promoting ecotourism in their region. A number of British Columbia farmers offer visitors to combine tourism with farm work, for example, through the WWOOF Canada program.

Sports

Education

K-12 education

British Columbia is home to a comprehensive education system consisting of public schools and independent schools that is overseen by the provincial Ministry of Education. The public school system is divided in 59 anglophone school districts and one francophone school district, the Conseil scolaire francophone de la Colombie-Britannique, which operates French-language public schools throughout the province. The anglophone school districts are governed by school board trustees who are directly elected by the school district's residents. Although 86 percent of students are enrolled in the public school system, British Columbia has one of the highest shares of independent school enrolment among Canadian province, at 14 percent of the student population, due to its relatively generous funding model; most independent schools receive 50 percent of the operating funding that their public counterparts receive from the government. A very small percentage (less than 1 percent) of students are home schooled.

Like most other provinces in Canada, education is compulsory from ages 6 to 16 (grades 1–10), although the vast majority of students remain in school until they graduate from high school (grade 12) at the age of 18. In order to graduate with a graduation certificate, known as a Dogwood Diploma in BC, students must take a minimum of 80 course credits during grades 10 to 12. These credits include a variety of required courses (e.g. in language arts, social studies, mathematics, and science), as well as elective courses.

Academic achievement in British Columbia is relatively good, although it has been slipping in recent years by some measures. In 2020, 86 percent of students in British Columbia graduated from high school within six years of entering grade 8. According to the 2018 Programme for International Student Assessment (PISA) scores, students in British Columbia scored the second highest in reading ability, fourth highest in mathematic prowess, and fourth highest in science knowledge of the 10 Canadian provinces, although these scores have declined significantly since the 2000 and 2015 assessments.

International students
In September 2014, there were 11,000 international students in BC public K-12 schools and about 3,000 international students in other BC K-12 schools.

Higher education

British Columbia has diverse array of higher educational institutions, ranging from publicly funded universities, colleges, and institutes, to private universities, colleges, seminaries, and career institutes. Public institutions receive approximately half of their funding from grants from the provincial government, with the remaining revenue stemming from tuition charges and philanthropic donations. Each post-secondary institution sets its own admission requirements, although the standard requirement is the completion of high school.

Public universities and colleges include:

 University of British Columbia
 Simon Fraser University
 University of Victoria
 University of Northern British Columbia
 Vancouver Island University
 British Columbia Institute of Technology
 Kwantlen Polytechnic University
 Thompson Rivers University
 Emily Carr University of Art and Design
 Royal Roads University
 Capilano University
 University of the Fraser Valley
 Douglas College
 Camosun College
 Langara College
 Selkirk College
 College of New Caledonia
 College of the Rockies
 Okanagan College
 Coast Mountain College
 Justice Institute of BC

British Columbia is also home to 11 private colleges and universities located throughout the province, including:

 Quest University
 Trinity Western University
 Alexander College
 University Canada West
 Columbia College
 Coquitlam College
 Tamwood International College
 Ashton College
 Blanche Macdonald
 Vanwest College

Two American universities (Fairleigh Dickinson University and Northeastern University) also have degree-granting campuses located in Vancouver.

See also

 Index of British Columbia–related articles
 Outline of British Columbia
 Symbols of British Columbia

Notes

References

Citations

Sources

Further reading

External links

 
 Tourism British Columbia official website
 BC Weathercams: Webcams showing realtime conditions across the province 
 BC government news
 
 
 
 
 BC government online map archive

 
1871 establishments in Canada
Provinces and territories of Canada
States and territories established in 1871
Geography of the Pacific Northwest
Western Canada